Hagar hf. is an Icelandic holding company based in Kópavogur that owns a number of retail and wholesale companies in Iceland, Sweden, and Denmark. Each of Hagar's companies are run individually. As of 2014, Hagar's subsidiaries had an combined 48% market share in the Icelandic food retail market. As of October 2016, the company operated 57 stores, including the Hagkaup and Bónus chains, and had approximately 2,200 employees. Hagar hf is listed on the Iceland Stock Exchange as HAGA.

Operations
 Hagkaup
 Bónus
 Aðföng
 Hýsing
 Ferskar kjötvörur
 Bananar ehf.
 Olíuverzlun Íslands

Hagar also used to operate stores in Iceland under franchise agreements for Debenhams, Topshop, Zara, Warehouse, Evans, Dorothy Perkins and Karen Millen. As of the beginning of 2018, Zara is the only remaining franchise still in operation.

References

External links
  
  

Holding companies of Iceland
Retail companies of Iceland